Urkesh or Urkish (Akkadian: 𒌨𒆧𒆠 UR.KIŠKI, 𒌨𒋙𒀭𒄲𒆠 UR.KEŠ3KI; modern Tell Mozan) is a tell, or settlement mound, located in the foothills of the Taurus Mountains in Al-Hasakah Governorate, northeastern Syria. It was founded during the fourth millennium BC, possibly by the Hurrians, on a site which appears to have been inhabited previously for a few centuries. The city god of Urkesh was Kumarbi, father of Teshup.

Geography
There are other contemporary ancient sites in this area of upper Khabur River basin. For example, Chagar Bazar is 22 km south of Mozan. Tell Arbid is located 45 km south of Tell Mozan. Tell Brak is about 50 km to the south.

Tell Leilan is located about 50 km to the east of Urkesh. Leilan, Brak and Urkesh were particularly prominent during the Akkadian period.

History
Urkesh is the only third millennium site that can be securely associated with the Hurrians. Throughout the Bronze Age, the city was a major Hurrian center. Seal inscriptions give evidence for a city ruler with the Hurrian name of Tupkish, and his queen with the Akkadian name of Uqnitum. Tupkish, who ruled during the ascendancy of the Akkadian Empire, assumed the title of "king of Urkesh and Nagar". The king was known by the title of endan, meaning king in Hurrian.

Urkesh was an ally of the Akkadian Empire through what is believed to have been a dynastic marriage tradition. Tar'am-Agade, the daughter of the Akkadian king, Naram-Sin, is believed to have been married to the king of Urkesh. During the early second millennium BC the city passed into the hands of the rulers of Mari, a city a few hundred miles to the south. The king of Urkesh became a vassal (and apparently an appointee) of Mari. The people of Urkesh evidently resented this, as the royal archives at Mari provide evidence of their strong resistance; in one letter, the king of Mari tells his Urkesh counterpart that "I did not know that the sons of your city hate you on my account. But you are mine, even if the city of Urkesh is not." In the middle of the millennium, Tell Mozan was the location of a Mitanni religious site. The city appears to have been largely abandoned circa 1350 BC, although the reason for this is unknown to archaeologists at this time.

Archaeology

Important excavated structures include the royal palace of Tupkish, an associated necromantic underground structure (Abi), a monumental temple terrace with a plaza in front and a temple at the top, residential areas, burial areas, and the inner and outer city walls.

Soundings at the site were first made by Max Mallowan during his survey of the area. Agatha Christie, his wife, wrote that they chose not to continue at the site because it seemed to have Roman material. No trace of Roman occupation levels have been found in later excavations, however. Mallowan went on to excavate Chagar Bazar, another site to the south of Mozan/Urkesh. Excavations at Tell Mozan began in 1984 and have been conducted for at least 17 seasons up to the present time. The work has been led by Giorgio Buccellati of UCLA and Marilyn Kelly-Buccellati of California State University, Los Angeles.
The 2007 season was primarily dedicated to working on publication material, primarily excavation units A16, J1, J3 and J4. A small sounding was done in J1 to clarify the transition between Mittani and Khabur. The excavations have been assisted at various times by other groups including the German Archaeological Institute.

The excavations at Tell Mozan are known for the project's interest in pursuing the uses of technology in an archaeological context. The main focus is on the 'Global Record', a method of documentation that combines journal entries into a hypertext based output. This system marries the advantages of both the database and prose type approaches, in that elements are individually linked across both stratigraphy and typology, and yet remain tied in a more synthetic whole through the narrative of the archaeological record. Another focal point of research at the site is the application of conservation.

The mud brick architecture which comprises the majority of the structures found to date has been preserved over the years though an innovative system. This system protects the monument while still allowing a detailed inspection of the primary document as originally unearthed. The same system affords an overview of the architectural volumes as perceived by the ancients. A sizeable lab in the field research facility allows the conservators to give the best possible on-site care while interacting with the excavations.

Special emphasis is placed on documenting the concrete types of contact which are observed in the ground. This is done with great detail at the level of each individual feature. From this evidence is automatically derived a complete depositional history of all elements in contact. The strata are conceived as segments of this continuum in which a single depositional moment can be reconstructed. The phases are periods that are culturally identifiable on the basis of typological and functional analysis. Horizons are the broad chronological subdivisions based on comparative material and as they can be linked to the general historical understanding.

One of the most important fixed points of reference for chronology are impressions on door sealings of the seal of Tar'am-Agade, the daughter of Naram-Sin, which because of stratigraphy can be firmly linked to phase 3 of the AP palace occupation.

Finds from the excavations at Tell Mozan are on display in the Deir ez-Zor Museum.

Syrian Civil War 2015-present
Excavations are on hold during the Syrian Civil War since 2011. The site lies close to the Turkish border, and is protected by Kurdish troops and a team of local workers.

Kings of Urkesh
The kings of the city were known by the title of endan, meaning king in Hurrian. The known kings of Urkesh include:

Tupkish (c. 2250 BC)
Tish-atal (date unknown)
Shatar-mat (date unknown)
Atal-shen (date unknown)
Te'irru (c. 1800 BC)

See also
Cities of the ancient Near East
Hurrian foundation pegs, also known as the "Urkish lions"
Ur of the Chaldees

Notes

Further reading
M. Kelly-Buccellati, "Urkesh and the North: Recent Discoveries",  Studies on the Civilization and Culture of the Nuzi and the Hurrians 15, General Studies and Excavations at Nuzi 11/1, pp. 3–28, 2005
Giorgio Buccellati and Marilyn Kelly Buccellati, Urkesh/Mozan Studies 3: Urkesh and the Hurrians : A Volume in Honor of Lloyd Cotsen, Undena, 1998, 
Rick Hauser, READING FIGURINES: Animal Representations in Terra Cotta from Royal Building AK at Urkesh (Tell Mozan), Undena, 2006, 
Peter M. M. G. Akkermans and Glenn M. Schwartz, The Archaeology of Syria: From Complex Hunter-Gatherers to Early Urban Societies (c.16,000-300 BC), Cambridge University Press, 2004, 
Giorgio Buccellati, A Lu E School Tablet from the Service Quarter of the Royal Palace AP at Urkesh, Journal of Cuneiform Studies, vol. 55, pp. 45–48, 2003
 Massimo Maiocchi, A Hurrian Administrative Tablet from Third Millennium Urkesh, in Zeitschrift für Assyriologie und vorderasiatische Archäologie, vol. 101(2), December 2011

External links
Urkesh excavations (official website)
Archaeobotany at Tell Mozan (Tübingen University)
86th Faculty Research Lecture: The Discovery of Ancient Urkesh and the Question of Meaning in Archaeology - Giorgio Buccellati, April 27, 1999 - UCLA webcast (utilizes RealPlayer)
World Monuments Fund Tel Mozan

 
Populated places established in the 4th millennium BC
States and territories disestablished in the 14th century BC
Hurrian cities
Akkadian Empire
Bronze Age sites in Syria
Former populated places in Syria
Archaeological sites in al-Hasakah Governorate
Neolithic sites in Syria
Tur Abdin
Tells (archaeology)
Former kingdoms